Francis X. Coppinger (born March 12, 1935 - July 9, 2020) was an American attorney and politician who served as a member of the Massachusetts House of Representatives from 1969 to 1973 and 1975 to 1977. He was an unsuccessful candidate for the Massachusetts Senate in 1972, state representative in 1976, 1992, and 1995, Boston City Council in 1981 and 1983, and Suffolk County Register of Probate in 1996.

In 2012, a bridge on Park Street in the West Roxbury neighborhood of Boston was named the Honorable Francis X. Coppinger Bridge in his honor.

References

1935 births
20th-century American politicians
Boston College alumni
New England Law Boston alumni
Massachusetts lawyers
Democratic Party members of the Massachusetts House of Representatives
Politicians from Boston
Living people